This is a listing of notable opponents of slavery, often called abolitionists.

Groups

Historical
 African Methodist Episcopal Church (American)
 American Anti-Slavery Society (American) 
 American Missionary Association (American)
 Anti-Slavery Society (British)
 Birmingham Ladies Society for the Relief of Negro Slaves, founded 1825 (British)
 Boston Female Anti-Slavery Society (American)
 Boston Vigilance Committee (American)
 British and Foreign Anti-Slavery Society, founded 1839, continues as Anti-Slavery International
 Committee for the Abolition of the Slave Trade (British)
 Free Soil Party (American)
 Free-Staters (Kansas) (American)
 Jayhawkers (American)
 International Justice Mission (American)
 Liberty Party (United States, 1840)
 Massachusetts Anti-Slavery Society (American)
 Massachusetts General Colored Association (American)
 New York Manumission Society (American)
 New England Anti-Slavery Society (American)
 New England Freedom Association (American)
 Oneida Institute (American)
 Pennsylvania Anti-Slavery Society (American)
 Religious Society of Friends (Quakers)
 Society for Effecting the Abolition of the Slave Trade, 1787–1807? (British, aka Abolition Society)
 Society for the Mitigation and Gradual Abolition of Slavery Throughout the British Dominions, 1823–1838 (British, aka Anti-Slavery Society)
 Society for the Relief of Free Negroes Unlawfully Held in Bondage (American)  
 Society of the Friends of the Blacks (Société des Amis des Noirs) (French)

Contemporary
 8th Day Center for Justice, a Roman Catholic non-profit organization based in Chicago, Illinois
 A Better World, organization that is based in Lacombe, Alberta, Canada
 A21 Campaign, 501(c)(3) non-profit, non-governmental organization that works to fight human trafficking
 ABC Nepal, non-profit non- governmental organisation working in Nepal on trafficking of girls and minors across Indian subcontinent and Arabian countries, founded by Durga Ghimire.
 Agape International Missions, nonprofit organization in Cambodia
 Anti-Slavery International, works at local, national and international levels to eliminate all forms of slavery around the world
 Arizona League to End Regional Trafficking, coalition representing partnerships with law enforcement, faith-based communities, non-profit organizations, social service agencies, attorneys and concerned citizens.
 Awareness Against Human Trafficking (HAART), non-governmental organization fighting against human trafficking in Kenya.
 California Against Slavery, human rights organization directed at strengthening California state laws to protect victims of sex trafficking
 Chab Dai, coalition founded by Helen Sworn that connects Christian organizations committed to ending sexual abuse and trafficking.
 Children's Organization of Southeast Asia (COSA), International Organization which works towards the prevention of child human trafficking and sexual exploitation within the Northern regions of Thailand, especially among hill-tribe communities.
 Coalition Against Trafficking in Women, international non-governmental organization opposing human trafficking, prostitution, and other forms of commercial sex
 Coalition to Abolish Slavery and Trafficking, Los Angeles-based anti-human trafficking organization
 ECPAT, international non-governmental organisation and network headquartered in Thailand which is designed to end the commercial sexual exploitation of children
 The Emancipation Network, international organization dedicated to fighting human trafficking and modern-day slavery
 Face to Face Bulgaria, organization whose primary mission is to prevent cases of forced prostitution and human trafficking in Bulgaria
 Free the Slaves, dedicated to ending Slavery Worldwide
 Freeset, organization whose primary mission is to provide sustainable employment and economic empowerment to victims of sex trafficking in South Asia.
 Global Alliance Against Traffic in Women, network of more than 100 non-governmental organisations from all regions of the world, who share a deep concern for the women, children and men whose human rights have been violated by the criminal practice of trafficking in persons
 Global Centurion, is non-profit organization that fights trafficking by focusing on demand
 Hope for Justice, identifies and rescues victims, advocates on their behalf, provides restorative care which rebuilds lives and trains frontline professionals to tackle slavery.
 Ing Makababaying Aksyon (Filipino)
 International Justice Mission, an anti-trafficking organization.
 La Strada International Association, international NGO network addressing trafficking in human beings in Europe
 Love 146, vision: abolition of child trafficking and slavery, nothing less.
 Maiti Nepal, non-profit organization in Nepal dedicated to helping victims of sex trafficking
 NASHI, a Saskatoon, Saskatchewan, Canada-based organisation that opposes human trafficking by raising awareness through education
 Office to Combat Trafficking in Persons, government agency responsible for coordinating efforts to address human trafficking in British Columbia, Canada
 Polaris Project, nonprofit, non-governmental organization that works to combat and prevent modern day slavery and human trafficking
 Prerana, non-governmental organization (NGO) that works in the red-light districts of Mumbai, India to protect children vulnerable to commercial sexual exploitation and trafficking. The organization runs three night care centers for children at risk, as well as shelter homes and a residential training center for girls rescued from the trafficking trade.
 Ratanak International, organisation that rescues children from sexual slavery and then provides them with education, rehabilitation, and safety
 Reaching Out Romania, non-governmental charitable organization in Romania that helps girls ages 13 to 22 exit the sex industry
 Redlight Children Campaign, non-profit organization created by New York lawyer and president of Priority Films Guy Jacobson and Israeli actress Adi Ezroni in 2002 to combat worldwide child sexual exploitation and human trafficking
 Run for Courage, nonprofit organization that combats human trafficking
 Somaly Mam Foundation (Cambodian)
 Slavery Footprint, nonprofit organization based in Oakland, California that works to end human trafficking and modern-day slavery.
 Stop Child Trafficking Now, organization founded by Lynette Lewis, an author and public speaker
 Stop the Traffik, campaign coalition which aims to bring an end to human trafficking worldwide
 The RINJ Foundation, Canadian-based women's group which adduces that vigorously prosecuting buyers of slaves is the way ahead to end Sexual slavery
 Truckers Against Trafficking, nonprofit organization that trains truck drivers to recognize and report instances of human trafficking
 Visayan Forum Foundation (Filipino)

Individuals

Historical

American

 Abigail Adams (American presidential wife and activist)
 John Quincy Adams (American President), had a long history of opposing slavery
 Bronson Alcott (American)
 Louisa May Alcott (American)
 Richard Allen (former slave, American Methodist)
 William G. Allen (American)
 Susan B. Anthony (American)
 Rosa Miller Avery (American)
 Gamaliel Bailey (American)
 Martha Violet Ball (American)
 Eusebius Barnard (American)
 Austin Bearse (American)
 Henry Ward Beecher (American)
 Anthony Benezet (American Quaker)
 John Bingham, Jayhawker and Senator (American)
 James Gillespie Birney (American)
 William Birney (American)
 William Henry Brisbane (American)
 John Brown (American)
 William Wells Brown (American)
 Anson Burlingame (American)
 Aaron Burr (American politician)
 Zachariah Chandler (American)
 William L. Chaplin (American)
 Maria Weston Chapman (American)
 Salmon P. Chase (American)
 Lydia Maria Child (American)
 Benjamin Butler (American)
 Elizabeth Buffum Chace (American activist)
 Elizabeth Margaret Chandler American writer and journalist, columnist
 Cassius Marcellus Clay (American)
 John Coburn (American)
 Levi Coffin (American)
 Nathaniel Colver (Baptist pastor and educator, American)
 Samuel Cornish (Presbyterian of African heritage, American)
 Oringe Smith Crary (American)
 Alexander Crummell, African-American missionary
 Henry Winter Davis (American)
 Martin Delany (son of a slave, American)
 Richard Dillingham (American)
 Frederick Douglass (former slave, American politician)
 Sarah Mapps Douglass (American)
 George Hussey Earle Sr. (American politician)
 David Einhorn (American rabbi)
 Ralph Waldo Emerson (American)
 Calvin Fairbank (American)
 Sarah Harris Fayerweather (American)
 John Gregg Fee (American)
 Charles Finney (American)
 James Forten (American)
 Margaretta Forten (American)
 Abby Kelley Foster (American)
 Stephen Symonds Foster (American)
 Benjamin Franklin (American)
 Amos Noë Freeman (American)
 John C. Frémont (American)
 Matilda Joslyn Gage (American)
 Thomas Galt (American), Vice-President, Illinois Anti-Slavery Society
 Eliza Ann Gardner (American)
 Henry Highland Garnet (American)
 Thomas Garrett (American)
 William Lloyd Garrison (American)
 Ulysses Grant (American)
 Horace Greeley (American)
 Beriah Green (American)
 Leonard Grimes (American)
 Charlotte Forten Grimké (American)
 Angelina Grimké (American)
 Sarah Moore Grimké (American)
 Alexander Hamilton (American)
 Hannibal Hamlin (American)
 Theophilus Harrington (American)
 Laura Smith Haviland (American)
 Lewis Hayden (former slave, American)
 Michael Heilprin (American rabbi)
 Hinton Rowan Helper (opposed slavery on economic grounds, American)
 James Butler "Wild Bill" Hickok (American)
 Elias Hicks (American)
 Thomas Wentworth Higginson (American)
 Thomas S. Hinde (American)
 Isaac Hopper (American)
 Julia Ward Howe (American)
 Samuel Gridley Howe (American)
 Thaddeus Hyatt (American)
 Robert G. Ingersoll (American)
 Francis Jackson (American)
 Harriet Jacobs (1813–1897) (former slave, American)
 John Jay (American)
 Absalom Jones (American)
 Hezekiah Joslyn (American)
 Abby Kelley (American)
 Gustav Koerner (German American)
 James H. Lane (Senator) (American)
 Mary Sampson Patterson Leary Langston (American)
 John Laurens (American)
 Benjamin Lay (American)
 Hart Leavitt (American), Underground Railroad operator, Massachusetts
 Joshua Leavitt (American), editor of the abolitionist newspaper The Emancipator
 Roger Hooker Leavitt (American), Underground Railroad operator, Massachusetts
 Abraham Lincoln (American President)
 Rose Livingston (American) 
 Toussaint L'Ouverture (former slave, a commander of the Haitian Revolution)
 Jermain Loguen (former slave, American)
 Elijah Lovejoy (American)
 James Russell Lowell (American)
 Maria White Lowell (American)
 Henry G. Ludlow (American)
 Benjamin Lundy (American)
 Samuel Joseph May (American)
 Isaac Mendenhall (American)
 Robert Morris (American)
 Lucretia Mott (American)
 William Cooper Nell (American)
 Frederick Law Olmsted (American)
 Samuel Oughton (American), advocate of black labour rights in Jamaica)
 John Parker (former slave, American)
 Theodore Parker (American) (1810–1860), Unitarian minister and abolitionist whose words inspired speeches by Abraham Lincoln and later by Martin Luther King Jr. ("The arc of the moral universe is long...")
 Francis Daniel Pastorius (German-American)
 Wendell Phillips (American)
 James Shepherd Pike (American), journalist
 Mary Ellen Pleasant (American)
 John Wesley Posey (American)
 Gabriel Prosser (insurrectionist, American slave)
 Harriet Forten Purvis (American)
 Robert Purvis (American)
 Sarah Louisa Forten Purvis (American)
 John Rankin (American)
 Hermann Raster (American)
 John D. Read (American)
 Charles Lenox Remond (American)
 Ernestine Rose (American)
 Benjamin Rush (American)
 John Brown Russwurm (Jamaican/American)
 Richard S. Rust (American)
 Dred Scott (American slave)
 Samuel Sewall (American)
 Samuel Edmund Sewall (American)
 William H. Seward, Secretary of State under Lincoln (American)
 Gerrit Smith (American)
 Joshua Bowen Smith (American)
 Silas Soule (American)
 Lysander Spooner (American lawyer)
 Edwin Stanton, Secretary of War under Lincoln (American)
 Elizabeth Cady Stanton (American)
 Henry Stanton (American)
 Thaddeus Stevens (American)
 Maria W. Stewart (American)
 William Still (American)
 Lucy Stone (American)
 Harriet Beecher Stowe (American)
 Charles Sumner (American)
 La Roy Sunderland (American)
 Arthur Tappan (American)
 Lewis Tappan (American)
 Henry David Thoreau (American)
 John Ton (Dutch-born American)
 Charles Turner Torrey (American)
 Joseph Tracy  (American)
 Sojourner Truth (American)
 Harriet Tubman (American)
 Nat Turner insurrectionist, former slave (American)
 Denmark Vesey insurrectionist, former slave (American)
 Benjamin Wade (American)
 David Walker (abolitionist) (son of a slave, American)
 Samuel Ringgold Ward (born into slavery, American)
 Theodore Dwight Weld (American)
 Charles Augustus Wheaton (American) Underground Railroad Operator, New York  
 Walt Whitman (American)
 John Greenleaf Whittier (American)
 Austin Willey (American newspaper editor)
 Henry Wilson (American Vice President)
 Hiram Wilson (Canada)
 John Woolman (American Quaker)
 Elizur Wright (American)
 Frances Wright (American)

Brazilian

 Antônio de Castro Alves (Brazilian)
 Maria Tomásia Figueira Lima (Brazilian)
 Luís Gama (Brazilian)
 Joaquim Nabuco (Brazilian)
 José do Patrocínio (Brazilian)
 André Rebouças (Brazilian)
 José Bonifácio de Andrada e Silva (Brazilian)
 Dragão do Mar (Brazilian)
 Maria Firmina dos Reis (Brazilian)
 Castro Alves (Brazilian)
 Ruy Barbosa (Brazilian)
 Pedro I of Brazil (Brazilian)
 Pedro II of Brazil (Brazilian)
 Isabel, Princess Imperial of Brazil (Brazilian)

British

 Josiah Wedgwood (British) produced "Am I Not A Man And A Brother?" anti-slavery medallion
 Henry Thornton (British)
 Bishop Beilby Porteus (British)
 Zachary Macaulay (British)
 David Livingstone (Scottish)
 Samuel Johnson (British)
 Elizabeth Heyrick (British)
 Prince Albert of Saxe-Coburg and Gotha (German/British)
 George William Alexander (British)
 William Allen (British Quaker)
 Thomas Binney (British)
 Henry Brougham, 1st Baron Brougham and Vaux (British)
 Thomas Burchell (British Jamaican)
 Thomas Fowell Buxton (British)
 John Clarkson (British)
 Thomas Clarkson (British)
 Josiah Conder (British)
 Ottobah Cugoano (African/British)
 John Cropper, Liverpudlian trader and philanthropist
 Thomas Day (British)
 Edward James Eliot (British)
 Olaudah Equiano former slave taken from modern day Nigeria (British)
 Alexander Falconbridge (British)
 Joseph Ketley (British)
 Fanny Kemble (British), author of Journal of a Residence on a Georgian Plantation in 1838–1839
 William Knibb (British)
 Charles Middleton, 1st Baron Barham (British)
 Hannah More (British)
 William Murray, 1st Earl of Mansfield (British)
 John Newton, former slave merchant (British)
 Richard Oastler (British)
 James Edward Oglethorpe (English, founder of the Province of Georgia)
 Thomas Paine (British born)
 Mary Prince (British)
 James Ramsay (British)
 William Rathbone IV (British)
 Ignatius Sancho (first ex-slave to vote, British)
 Granville Sharp (British)
 James Sherman (British)
 Kathleen Simon (British) 
 John Smith (British missionary to Demerara, Guyana)
 William Smith (British)
 Herbert Spencer (British)
 George Thompson (British)
 John Harfield Tredgold (British)
 John Wesley (British)
 William Wilberforce (British) Leading Parliamentary abolitionist

Canadian

 Henry Bibb, publisher The Voice of the Fugitive newspaper (Canadian)
 George Brown (Canadian)
 Mary Ann Shadd Cary, publisher Provincial Freeman newspaper (Canadian)
 Ward Chipman (Canadian)

Colombian

 José Hilario López (Colombian)

Chilean

 José Miguel Infante (Chilean)

Dutch

 Anna Amalia Bergendahl (Dutch)

French

 Henri Grégoire (French)
 Louis X of France (Louis X Capet, 1315, Kingdom of France)
 Marie-Thérèse Lucidor Corbin (French Creole)
 Gilbert du Motier, marquis de Lafayette (French)
 Guillaume de Félice (French)
 Olympe de Gouges (French)
 Maximilien Robespierre (French)
 Victor Schœlcher (French)

German

 Charles Follen (German)

India

 Periyar E. V. Ramasamy (Founder of Self Respect Movement in Southern India)

Irish

 Daniel O'Connell (Irish)

Italian

 Philip Mazzei (Italian)

Jamaican

 Samuel Sharpe (Jamaican)

Mexican

 Vicente Guerrero (Mexican)
 José María Morelos (Mexican)
 Miguel Hidalgo (Mexican)

Peruvian

 Ramón Castilla, politician (Peruvian president)

Polish

 Theodore de Korwin Szymanowski (Polish)

Puerto Rican

 Ramón Emeterio Betances (Puerto Rican)

Spanish

 Julio Vizcarrondo (Spanish, born in Puerto Rico)

Venezuelan

 Simon Bolivar (Venezuelan)
 José Gregorio Monagas (Venezuelan)

Contemporary
 David Batstone founder of the non-profit organization Not for Sale (American)
 Don Brewster founder of Agape International Missions (American)
 Florrie R. Burke (American)
 Vednita Carter founder of Breaking Free (American)
 Katherine Chon co-founder of Polaris Project (American)
 Derek Ellerman co-founder of Polaris Project (American)
 Durga Ghimire (Nepali)
 Maria Grazia Giammarinaro (Italian)
 Glendene Grant mother of slave, founder of Mothers Against Trafficking in Humans (Canadian)
 Nick Grono Freedom Fund and Walk Free Foundation (Australian)
 Siddharth Kara author of  Sex Trafficking: Inside the Business of Modern Slavery (2009) and  Bonded Labor: Tackling the System of Slavery in South Asia (American)
 Rachel Lloyd (British)
 Rose Livingston former slave who worked to free slaves in New York City (American)
 Iana Matei founder of Reaching Out Romania (Romanian)
 Somaly Mam founder of Somaly Mam Foundation (Cambodian)
 Bukola Oriola former slave, author of Imprisoned: The Travails of a Trafficked Victim (Nigerian)
 Kathleen Simon, Viscountess Simon (British)
 Elizabeth Smart former slave, founder of Elizabeth Smart Foundation (American)
 Linda Smith (American politician) founder of Shared Hope International (American)
 Helen Sworn (English)
 Sheila White former slave (American)
 Ansar Burney (Pakistani activist)

See also
 List of African-American abolitionists
 Abolitionism in the United Kingdom
 Abolitionism in the United States
 African American founding fathers of the United States
 History of slavery in the United States
 Radical Republicans
 Timeline of the civil rights movement
 Underground Railroad

Further reading
  .  Winner, 2007 Governor General's Literary Award for Nonfiction; Nominee (Nonfiction), National Books Critics Circle Award 2007.  See, Governor General's Award for English language non-fiction.

References 

 
Pre-emancipation African-American history
Abolitionists
Abolitionists
Slavery-related lists